Way Beyond Blue is the debut album by Welsh band Catatonia.  It has been seen by many fans as being something of a compilation album, as all but five on the album had appeared on one of the band's early EPs or singles, albeit different renditions (see below).  It spawned the band's first top 40 hit, "You've Got a Lot to Answer For" which hit No. 35.

Track listing

Personnel
 Cerys Matthews – vocals
 Mark Roberts – guitar
 Owen Powell – guitar
 Paul Jones – bass
 Aled Richards – drums (tracks 1-5, 7, 9, 11)
 Dafydd Ieuan – drums (tracks 2, 6-8, 10, 12)

References

1996 debut albums
Catatonia (band) albums
Blanco y Negro Records albums
Albums produced by Stephen Street